Li Xiaoqing (born 22 December 1995) is a Chinese handball player for Beijing Army and the Chinese national team.

She competed at the 2015 World Women's Handball Championship in Denmark.

References

1995 births
Living people
Chinese female handball players
Handball players at the 2014 Asian Games
Handball players at the 2018 Asian Games
Asian Games silver medalists for China
Asian Games medalists in handball
Medalists at the 2018 Asian Games